Christian Abt (born 8 May 1967) is a race car driver born in Kempten, Germany, into a family of amateur race drivers and car dealers.

His elder brother Hans-Jürgen Abt runs the Abt Sportsline Audi racing teams as well as their tuning company for Audi and Volkswagen.

Christian Abt started his career in motocross and then moved on to German Formula BMW. He went on to become the 1991 champion.

In 1992 he won the German Formula Three Championship B-Cup.

Driving a privately entered Audi A4 with the quattro 4-Wheel-Drive as this was banned for factory entrants, he won the German Supertouring Championship (STW) in 1999, the last season of this series, under controversial circumstances, taking the title only after the STW annulled the last lap of the final round of the Nürburgring.

Still considered as privateers, Abt entered the new Deutsche Tourenwagen Masters with hastily built cars similar to Audi TT. When driving an Audi R8 for Joest Racing at the 24 Hours of Le Mans that year, Abt called no other than Roland Asch to step in.

Racing record

Complete 24 Hours of Le Mans results

Complete Deutsche Tourenwagen Masters results
(key) (Races in bold indicate pole position) (Races in italics indicate fastest lap)

1 - Shanghai was a non-championship round.
† — Retired, but was classified as he completed 90% of the winner's race distance.

External links

Christian Abt
Abt Sportsline company

1967 births
24 Hours of Le Mans drivers
Deutsche Tourenwagen Masters drivers
German racing drivers
Living people
People from Kempten im Allgäu
Sportspeople from Swabia (Bavaria)
Racing drivers from Bavaria
Swedish Touring Car Championship drivers
ADAC GT Masters drivers
Audi Sport drivers
Abt Sportsline drivers
Team Joest drivers
Phoenix Racing drivers
Nürburgring 24 Hours drivers
Porsche Carrera Cup Germany drivers